Stephen Manas (born July 27, 1992) is a French actor, music composer, and screenwriter.

Manas began his career in India, the Philippines, Japan, and the United Kingdom before returning to France. He is best known for his recurring role as Richard Montlaur in the Apple TV+ comedy series Ted Lasso, starring Jason Sudeikis.

Early life
Manas was born on July 27, 1992 in Saint-Germain-en-Laye, Yvelines. He grew up in Megève, a ski resort village in the southeastern Alps in Haute-Savoie, Auvergne-Rhône-Alpes region, France. As his mother was a ski instructor, he found a love for skiing, martial arts, and outdoor sports at a young age. He realized he wanted to work in the film industry after watching Harry Potter and the Philosopher's Stone. He was also interested in music, and played several instruments.

At the age of 17, Manas moved to Lyon to enter an international research school in marketing and communication. Shortly after, he was spotted on the street by an acting scout and was cast for a small role in an independent film. Not yet knowing that this path would become his vocation, he continued his studies at the University of Paris 1 Pantheon-Sorbonne. After his graduation with a Master 2 in international marketing and communication research, he worked in the business world, but was unsatisfied with his career. He then chose to focus on acting. He spent most of his weekends practising acting, shooting student short films, and playing music.

Career

Acting
Manas's first role was in the movie Ma premiere fois, directed by Marie-Castille Mention-Schaar. He appeared in many dramas on French television channels TF1, TMC, and M6 during his studies in Paris. After a talent agency based in India cold-called him and offered him a three-year contract, he moved to India where he immersed himself in the Bollywood industry, building his acting résumé. 

After two years living and working between Bollywood and Mumbai, then Manila and Tokyo, he returned to France in 2018. Once back in Paris, Manas was chosen for the role of Christian in the short film Out of Frame/Hors Champ. He won multiple awards for this role.

In August 2019, as a first-time guest at the Cannes Film Festival, Manas met an agent specializing in international casting. A month later, he joined the cast of the new series Apple TV+, Ted Lasso in a recurring role, playing Richard Montlaur, a young French player on a Premier League football team in England. The series stars Jason Sudeikis, Hannah Waddingham, Brendan Hunt, Nick Mohammed, Juno Temple, Jeremy Swift, Phil Dunster, and Brett Goldstein.

Music
Music also has an important place in Manas' life; he started playing music at 8 years old. He first played clarinet in a orchestra in Megève until he was 15, then he switched to saxophone and at 18, he learned piano and guitar. He began composing music in 2016. As of 2020, he has his own musical production, Sound-it.

Filmography

Film

Television

Music Composition

Awards and nominations

References

External links
 

1992 births
Living people
French male film actors
French male television actors
21st-century French male actors
French male screenwriters
French screenwriters